Arsuk is a village in the Sermersooq municipality in southwestern Greenland. It had 73 inhabitants in 2020. The name of the settlement means the beloved place in the Greenlandic language. The village is served by the communal all-purpose Pilersuisoq store.

Geography 
Arsuk is located at the southern end of the Sermersooq municipality, on the coast of Labrador Sea near the mouth of the Arsuk Fjord in the southeast. The  Kuunnaat mountain rises on the mainland directly to the north of the village.

History 

The region was first settled by people of the Saqqaq culture arriving from the north. The area was resettled by the Norse between the 10th century and the 14th century. Thule people were the second southbound Inuit migration, to arrive in the region in the 15th century, with the area permanently settled since then.

The discovery of cryolite in Ivittuut in the inner parts of Arsuk Fjord attracted the interest of the Danes during the colonial era, leading to the formal foundation of the settlement in 1805. The timber Lutheran church was built in 1830.

The mines closed in 1987, with the Ivittuut settlement abandoned soon thereafter, leaving Arsuk on the economic periphery despite its tourism potential.

Transport 
Arsuk is a port of call for the Arctic Umiaq Line coastal ship, linking the village with Paamiut in the north (6.5 hours), and Qaqortoq in the southeast (9.5 hours), both towns serviced by Air Greenland.

Population 
Most towns and settlements in southern Greenland exhibit negative growth patterns over the last two decades, with many settlements rapidly depopulating. Arsuk has been losing population for almost every year in the last two decades. It lost more than half of its population relative to the 1990 levels, over 10% relative to the 2000 levels. The sharp decline in the 1990s was due to the mine closure and loss of employment. The weak growth in the late 2000s and stabilization of the population level prevented Arsuk from sharing the fate of Qassimiut, which lost more than two thirds of the population and is headed for abandonment − and that of Kangerluarsoruseq in the same municipality, which has already been abandoned in 2009.

References

Populated places in Greenland
Populated places established in 1805
1805 establishments in Greenland